In cryptography, DEAL (Data Encryption Algorithm with Larger blocks) is a symmetric block cipher derived from the Data Encryption Standard (DES). Its design was presented Lars Knudsen at the SAC conference in 1997, and submitted as a proposal to the AES contest in 1998 by Richard Outerbridge.

DEAL is a Feistel network which uses DES as the round function. It has a 128-bit block size and a variable key size of either 128, 192, or 256 bits; with 128-bit and 192-bit keys it applies 6 rounds, or 8 rounds with 256-bit keys. It has performance comparable to Triple DES, and was therefore relatively slow among AES candidates.

See also
 Ladder-DES
 Luby–Rackoff block cipher

External links
 The original DEAL report
 SCAN's entry for DEAL
 AES presentation slides (PDF)

References
 
 Stefan Lucks: On Security of the 128-Bit Block Cipher DEAL. Fast Software Encryption 1999: 60–70

Data Encryption Standard
Feistel ciphers